Boronia algida, commonly known as alpine boronia, is a flowering plant in the citrus family, Rutaceae and is endemic to south-eastern Australia. It is an erect shrub with many branches, pinnate leaves and white to bright pink, four-petalled flowers usually borne singly on the ends of branches.

Description
The flowers are white to bright pink and borne singly, sometimes in groups of up to three on the ends of branches. The eight stamens alternate in length, with those near the sepals longer than those near the petals.

Taxonomy and naming
Boronia algida was first formally described in 1855 by Ferdinand von Mueller who described it as "a charming bush" and published the description in his book Definitions of rare or hitherto undescribed Australian plants. The specific epithet (algida) is a Latin word meaning "cold", von Mueller having noted that this plant grows "on the highest stony declivities of our Alps".

Distribution and habitat
The alpine boronia grows in heath and forest, mainly in sandy soil over granite at higher altitudes, south from the Gibraltar Range in New South Wales to the Australian Capital Territory and Mount Buffalo, Mount Hotham and the Nunniong Plateau in Victoria.

References 

algida
Flora of the Australian Capital Territory
Flora of New South Wales
Flora of Victoria (Australia)
Plants described in 1855
Taxa named by Ferdinand von Mueller